Loyola Technical Institute, Madurai, Tamil Nadu, India, was founded by the Jesuits in 1952, in the Catholic Archdiocese of Madurai.

Loyola Technical Institute, founded in 1952, is a part of the Jesuit’s Madurai Province.

References

Jesuit universities and colleges in India
Colleges in Tamil Nadu
Education in Madurai
Educational institutions established in 1952
1952 establishments in Madras State